Depot Park is a public park in Troutdale, Oregon, United States. The  park is along the Union Pacific Railroad and Beaver Creek. It has hosted the Troutdale Open Air Market. There are plans for a three-mile-long trail from Depot Park to Mt. Hood Community College, as of 2017.

See also

 Depot Rail Museum

References

External links
 
  (October 24, 2016), Pamplin Media

Parks in Multnomah County, Oregon
Troutdale, Oregon